Henrique Johannpötter (January 23, 1933 – July 19, 2011) was the Roman Catholic bishop of the Roman Catholic Diocese of Bacabal, Brazil.

Born in Germany, Johannpötter was ordained to the priesthood in 1961. In 1988 he was named coadjutor bishop of the diocese and eventually became bishop resigning in 1997.

Notes

20th-century Roman Catholic bishops in Brazil
1933 births
2011 deaths
20th-century German Roman Catholic priests
Roman Catholic bishops of Bacabal